Rio Grande Valley FC, also known as RGVFC or Rio Grande Valley FC Toros, is an American professional soccer team based in Edinburg, Texas operated by Lone Star, LLC. They joined the USL Championship in the 2016 season.

The team served as a hybrid affiliate of the Houston Dynamo of Major League Soccer. Chris Canetti, Houston Dynamo president, called the relationship "an important and necessary step." The hybrid affiliation, a first for the USL, means that the Dynamo will be responsible for the soccer operation of the club, selecting players and coaching staff. The ownership group, Lone Star, will be responsible for operations and day-to-day management of the club.

History
In September 2014, Dynamo officials met with USL officials about creating a USL team and announced their intention to have a USL team in place for the 2016 season.

In March 2015, Bert Garcia announced that the Rio Grande Valley Vipers of the NBA D-league had been awarded a franchise pending concrete plans for a stadium and a name and confirmed a report on MLSSoccer.com that the Houston Dynamo would likely be the MLS affiliate for the USL team in the Rio Grande Valley.

In December 2015, the Houston Dynamo signed Dynamo Academy product Charly Flores as the first player of the Toros.

In December 2020, RGV FC Toros separated from the Houston Dynamo and became an independent soccer club.

Record

Year–by–year

Head coaches
 Includes USL Regular season, USL Play-offs and Lamar Hunt U.S. Open Cup

Stadium
The club has a 9,400-seat soccer-specific stadium in Edinburg, Texas for the team. It was set to open after the Toros played three games at the soccer complex at the University of Texas Rio Grande Valley to start the 2016 USL Season.

The stadium was never completed for play in 2016.  Construction of the H-E-B Park was completed during the first quarter of 2017 and the Toros played C.F. Monterrey from Mexico on March 22, 2017 to inaugurate their new stadium.  The Toros lost their exhibition match against Rayados 0–3.
The Toros won their first home game at H-E-B Park on April 12, 2017 against the Colorado Springs Switchbacks.
Their current home record attendance is 7,820 which was set on April 29, 2017 against the Oklahoma City Energy.

Players and staff

Roster

Staff
  Wílmer Cabrera – Head Coach, Sporting Director
  Gerson Echeverry – Assistant Coach, Director of Scouting
  Rafael Amaya – Assistant Coach

References

External links
 

 
Association football clubs established in 2015
USL Championship teams
Houston Dynamo FC
2015 establishments in Texas
Soccer clubs in Texas
Reserve soccer teams in the United States
Sports in the Rio Grande Valley